Nicole Gergely (born 12 November 1984) is an Austrian professional golfer. She became the first Austrian to win on the Ladies European Tour when she won the Open de France Dames in 2009.

Biography
Gergely was Austrian champion as an amateur and won several international tournaments. She turned professional in 2005 and qualified for the 2006 European Tour. Following her tour career she became a Fully Qualified PGA Golf Professional and coach for the Austrian National Team.

Professional wins (1)

Ladies European Tour wins (1)

Team appearances
Amateur
European Girls' Team Championship (representing Austria): 2002

References

External links

Austrian female golfers
Ladies European Tour golfers
Sportspeople from Styria
People from Judenburg
1984 births
Living people